John James Jaffurs III (April 15, 1923 – November 28, 1996) was an American football player and coach. He played professionally as a guard in the National Football League (NFL) with the Washington Redskins in 1936. Jaffurs played college football at Pennsylvania State University and was selected in the 29th round of the 1943 NFL Draft.

Jaffurs was the oldest of seven children born to Greek immigrants. He grew up in Wilkinsburg, Pennsylvania and graduated from Wilkinsburg High School. During World War II, in the United States Army as a second lieutenant and wounded at the Battle of the Bulge. After playing in the NFL, Jaffurs worked as an assistant football coach at Washington and Lee University in Lexington, Virginia. He later coached at Ithaca High School and Cornell University in Ithaca, New York. Jaffurs died on November 28, 1996, at his home in South Park, Pennsylvania.

References

External links
 

1923 births
1996 deaths
American football guards
Cornell Big Red football coaches
Penn State Nittany Lions football players
Washington Redskins players
Washington and Lee Generals football coaches
High school football coaches in New York (state)
United States Army officers
United States Army personnel of World War II
People from Wilkinsburg, Pennsylvania
Players of American football from Pennsylvania